Yanaul (Yañawıl) is a town in the Republic of Bashkortostan, Russia, located on the Yanaulka River,  north of Ufa. Population:

History
A settlement in place of the modern town has been known to exist since the first half of the 18th century. It was granted town status in 1991.

Administrative and municipal status
Within the framework of administrative divisions, Yanaul serves as the administrative center of Yanaulsky District, even though it is not a part of it. As an administrative division, it is incorporated separately as the town of republic significance of Yanaul—an administrative unit with the status equal to that of the districts. As a municipal division, the town of republic significance of Yanaul is incorporated within Yanaulsky Municipal District as Yanaul Urban Settlement.

References

Notes

Sources

Cities and towns in Bashkortostan